The Order of the Golden Eagle or "Altyn Qyran" Order (Altyn Qyran ordenı) is the highest order of Kazakhstan. The order is awarded by the President of Kazakhstan. Established in 1995, the order recognizes outstanding service to Kazakhstan. The Order of the Golden Eagle may be awarded to individuals who have previously been awarded orders by Kazakhstan or the Soviet Union. The President of the Republic of Kazakhstan becomes a Commander special class of the Order of Altyn Kyran.

Notable recipients
Boris Yeltsin, President of the Russian Federation (1997)
Islam Karimov, President of Uzbekistan (1997)
Jiang Zemin, General Secretary of the Chinese Communist Party and President of the People's Republic of China (1997) 
Leonid Kuchma, President of Ukraine (1999)
Elizabeth II, Queen of the United Kingdom (2000) 
Gerhard Schröder, Chancellor of Germany (2003) 
Vladimir Putin, President of the Russian Federation (2004)
Hosni Mubarak, President of Egypt (2008)
Akihito, Emperor of Japan (2008)
Khalifa bin Zayed Al Nahyan, Emir of Abu Dhabi and President of the UAE (2009)
Tarja Halonen, President of Finland (2009)
Lee Myung-bak, President of the Republic of Korea (2009)
Nicolas Sarkozy, President of France (2009)
Recep Tayyip Erdoğan, Prime Minister of Turkey (2012)
Abdullah Gül, President of Turkey (2012)
Juan Carlos I, King of Spain (2013)
Kassym-Jomart Tokayev, President of Kazakhstan (2019)
Ilham Aliyev, President of Azerbaijan (2022)
Xi Jinping, General Secretary of the Chinese Communist Party and President of the People's Republic of China (2022)
Salman of Saudi Arabia, King of Saudi Arabia and Custodian of the Two Holy Mosques (2022)

See also
Orders, decorations, and medals of Kazakhstan

References

Orders, decorations, and medals of Kazakhstan
Awards established in 1995